Filmore Watt Daniels and Thomas F. Richards were lynched in Mer Rouge, Morehouse Parish, Louisiana by black robed Ku Klux Klan members on August 24, 1922. According to the United States Senate Committee on the Judiciary they were the 47th and 48th of 61 lynchings during 1922 in the United States. There were five lynchings in the state of Louisiana and of the 61 lynchings they were 2 of 6 white victims.

Background

The Ku Klux Klan was extremely powerful in Louisiana since its revival in 1915. By 1924, there were thousands of Klan members in Louisiana, with each member paying $10 ($150 in 2022) to join. In 1922, Louisiana Governor John M. Parker pleaded with J. Edgar Hoover (then Assistant Director of the Bureau of Investigation) to help him as he wrote, "the Ku Klux Klan has grown so powerful in my state that it effectively controls the northern half. It has already kidnapped, tortured, and killed two people who opposed it…and it has threatened many more."

In Morehouse Parish, Louisiana there was a fierce rivalry between Mer Rouge and the larger community of Bastrop. In Bastrop, there existed a shadow Ku Klux Klan organization, Klan No 34, who held a powerful role as a morality vigilanty group. With the approval of Sheriff Fred Carpenter, they frequently attacked houses of prostitution, illegal liquor stills (Prohibition in the United States made alcohol illegal from 1920-1933) and other "vices". Klan No 34 was led by Cyclops J.K. Skipwith, a civil war veteran.

In Mer Rouge there were vocal critics of the Klan No 34's actions, some of which included:

70-year-old J.L. Daniel a wealthy Mer Rouge landowner
Filmore Watt Daniel, J.L. Daniel's son, a graduate of Louisiana State University
Thomas F. Richards a garage mechanic and good friend of F. Watt Daniel
W.C. Andrews
C.C. "Tot" Davenport

They objected to Klan No 34 imposing their morality on residents of Mer Rouge.

Lynching

In Bastrop, on August 24, 1922, Morehouse Parish, Louisiana held a festival called the "good roads bond rally." Events included a picnic and baseball game. After the event, a group of around 50 cars returned from Bastrop to Mer Rouge around 5:00 PM. At the halfway mark between the towns, the convoy was stopped by heavily armed black-robed KKK men who searched every vehicle. At gunpoint, they forced five men from their cars Watt Daniel, Thomas F. Richards, J.L. Daniel, W.C. Andrews and C.C. "Tot" Davenport from their cars. That was the last time F. Watt Daniel and Thomas F. Richards were seen alive.

Witnesses testified in later investigations that near Lake Lafourche they saw a truck filled with black-hooded men guarding two blindfolded men in the bed of the truck. The same witnesses later saw the truck return minus the two blindfolded men about 45 minutes later.

Aftermath

Local Bastrop authorities, heavily infiltrated by the KKK, covered up the killings. Relatives of the missing had to appeal to State officials to get help in discovering the fate of the missing men, Filmore Watt Daniels and Thomas F. Richards.

Events came to a head when on December 19, 1922, Governor John M. Parker declared Morehouse Parish under martial law. Divers searching for the bodies of F. Watt Daniel and Thomas F. Richards had to be guarded by Louisiana National Guardsmen. On December 24, 1922, a "mysterious explosion" brought the badly decomposed bodies of two men to the surface of Lake Lafourche. New Orleans pathologists brought in specially by the Governor identified the bodies by noting that one wore a belt buckle with the initials "F.W.D." (F. Watt Daniel) and the other had clothing that Richards reportedly wore the night he went missing.

There was much speculation on the motive behind the lynchings but the silence of those involved limited why the men were killed. The leading theory was related to an alleged attack on the car of Dr. B. M. McKoin, a top official in the Klan No 34 enforcement squad. The survivors of the lynchings said they were questioned about this event but professed their innocence.

Trial

After the discovery of the bodies as many as 50 witnesses testified during January 1923 that members of Klan No 34 including Sheriff Fred Carpenter and all deputies of the Morehouse Parish Sheriff's Office, District Attorney David Garrett, the local postmaster, T. Jeff Burnett, former Deputy Sheriff, and the leader of Klan no 34, J.K. Skipwith, were behind the kidnapping, torture and murder of Daniels and Richards. However, the infiltration of the local grand jury system by Klan members allowed them to dismiss the case for "insufficient evidence".

Louisiana Attorney General Adolphe V. Coco was able to eventually bring minor charges in April of 1923 on the Klan and 17 of its associates. This briefly caused them to flee the state until most of the charges were dropped. These attempts to seek justice ended in late 1923 when Governor Parker had retired and Attorney General Coco lost his reelection bid.

See also

Brown Culpepper was living in Holly Grove, Louisiana when he was lynched on March 13, 1922.
Joe Pemberton was lynched in Benton, Louisiana	on July 7, 1922
Thomas Rivers was lynched in Bossier Parish, Louisiana	on August 30, 1922

Bibliography
Notes

References
 - Total pages: 304 

 - Total pages: 248

1922 riots
1922 in Louisiana
Lynching deaths in Louisiana
August 1922 events
Protest-related deaths
Riots and civil disorder in Tennessee
White American riots in the United States